Ali Kemal Bey (7 September 1869 – 6 November 1922) was a British-Turkish journalist, newspaper editor, poet, liberal-leaning politician, and government official who was for some three months Minister of the Interior in the government of Damat Ferid Pasha, the Grand Vizier of the Ottoman Empire. He was murdered by paramilitary officers during the Turkish War of Independence.

Kemal is the father of Zeki Kuneralp, who was the former Turkish ambassador in Switzerland, the United Kingdom, and Spain. In addition, he is the paternal grandfather of both the Turkish diplomat Selim Kuneralp, and the British politician Stanley Johnson. Through Johnson, Ali Kemal is the great-grandfather of former British prime minister Boris Johnson and his siblings.

Life and career 

Kemal's father, Hacı Ahmet Rıza Effendi, was a Turk from the village of Kalfat in Çankırı, whilst his mother was a Circassian, reputedly of slave origin. Kemal was a journalist who travelled widely as a result of being banished from Turkey for his political views. On one of several visits to Switzerland, he met and fell in love with an Anglo-Swiss girl, Winifred Brun, the daughter of Frank Brun by his marriage to Margaret Johnson. They were married in Paddington, London, on 11 September 1903.

Early in his life, Kemal had acquired strong liberal democratic convictions, which caused him to be exiled from the Ottoman Empire under Abdul Hamid II, but immediately after the end of the sultan's personal rule in July 1908, he became one of the most prominent figures in Ottoman journalistic and political life. Because of his opposition to the Committee of Union and Progress, the Young Turk group which had carried out the revolution, he spent most of the following decade in opposition.

He was at one time editor of the liberal İkdam newspaper and a leading member of the Liberty Party.

In The Times dated 9 March 1909, on speculating that he would contest the seat of the late Minister of Justice Refik Bey, Kemal was described as amongst the "leading men of letters in Turkey, an excellent speaker, and personally very popular". Kemal was unanimously adopted as the Liberty Party's candidate for Stambul at a party meeting on 9 March 1909, though he lost the by-election to the CUP's candidate, Mehmed Rifat Pasha.

After the murder of the editor-in-chief of the Serbestî newspaper, Hasan Fehmi, in April 1909, Kemal stated that he had warned Ismail Qemali and Rifsat, the assistant editor of Serbestî that they had been condemned by extremists in Salonica. A media storm between the liberal paper İkdam and the organ Tanin followed, with İkdam accusing Ahmet Rıza Bey of having been in favour of enlightened absolutism, and Tanin, the organ of the Committee of Union and Progress (CUP) accusing Liberty Party of being a subversive body, conspiring with Armenians. At that time Kemal accused Rahmi Bey and Dr Nazım Bey of the CUP of proposing his murder. These events happened during the 31 March Incident, an effort to dismantle the Second Constitutional Era of the Ottoman Empire and restore it as an autocracy under Abdul Hamid II. Soldiers from Salonica deposed Abdul Hamid on 27 April 1909 and his brother Reshad Efendi was proclaimed as Sultan Mehmed V.

Kemal fled to exile in England, where in late 1909, his wife Winifred gave birth to a son, Osman Wilfred Kemal, in Bournemouth. Shortly after giving birth his wife died of puerperal fever. They already had a son Lancelot Beodar who died in Switzerland aged 18 months after contracting whooping cough, and a daughter named Celma. Kemal stayed with his mother-in-law Margaret Brun (née Johnson) and with his children, first in Christchurch, near Bournemouth, and then in Wimbledon, London until 1912, when he returned to the Ottoman Empire, soon marrying again. His second wife was Sabiha Hanım, the daughter of an Ottoman pasha. They had one son, Zeki Kuneralp, who was born in October 1914.

On his return from exile, Kemal made a speech in favour of a war against the Balkan League in Stambul on 3 October 1912. Montenegro started the First Balkan War by declaring war against the Ottomans on 8 October 1912.

On a report dated 11 November 1918 (Armistice Day) speculating on the successor to Ahmed İzzet Pasha, The Times reported that Kemal was backing Ahmet Tevfik Pasha to be grand vizier, with the support of the Naval and Khoja parties. A later report in The Times dated 19 May 1919, stated that Kemal had been appointed Minister of the Interior in the cabinet of Damat Ferid Pasha, replacing Mehmet Ali Bey who had retired. Kemal was one of the members of the Ottoman delegation to the Paris peace conference in June 1919. In an article dated 25 June 1919, The Times reported that Kemal had accused agents of the CUP of impeding the restoration of order in the Ottoman provinces, specifically accusing Talat Pasha of organising Albanian brigand bands in İzmit and Enver Pasha of doing the same in the Panderma, Balikesir, and Karasi districts. He also alleged that the CUP had £700,000 of party funds available for propaganda, as well as numerous fortunes made by profiteering during the Great War. In fact, Kemal had resigned between the filing of the report and its publication in The Times on 3 July 1919.

Kemal condemned the attacks on and massacres of the empire's Armenians during the First World War and inveighed against the Unionist chieftains as the authors of that crime, relentlessly demanding their prosecution and punishment. In an 18 July 1919 issue of the Alemdar newspaper, Ali Kemal Bey wrote: "... our Minister of Justice has opened the doors of prisons. Don't let us try to throw the blame on the Armenians; we must not flatter ourselves that the world is filled with idiots. We have plundered the possessions of the men whom we deported and massacred; we have sanctioned theft in our Chamber and our Senate. Let us prove that we have sufficient national energy to put the law into force against the heads of these bands who have trampled justice underfoot and dragged our honour and our national life through the dust." In a 28 January 1919 issue of the Sabah newspaper, Kemal Bey wrote, "Four or five years ago a historically singular crime has been perpetrated, a crime before which the world shudders. Given its dimensions and standards, its authors do not number in the fives, or tens, but in the hundreds of thousands. In fact, it has already been demonstrated that this tragedy was planned on the basis of a decision reached by the Central Committee of Ittihad."

He campaigned also against the Kemalist movement. Along with other conservatives serving under the Sultan in Istanbul, Kemal also set up an organisation known as the İngiliz Muhipler Cemiyeti ("The Anglophile Society"), which advocated British protectorate status for Turkey. This, combined with his past opposition to the CUP, made him anathema to the nationalist movement gathering strength in Ankara and fighting the Turkish War of Independence against the attempts between Greece and the Entente Powers to partition Anatolia.

Assassination 
On 4 November 1922, Kemal was kidnapped from a barber shop at Tokatlıyan Hotel in Istanbul, and was carried to the Anatolian side of the city by a motorboat en route to Ankara for a trial on charges of treason. On 6 November 1922, the party was intercepted at İzmit by Nureddin Pasha, then the Commander of the First Army, which was aligned with Mustafa Kemal Pasha. Ali Kemal was attacked and lynched by a group of paramilitary officers set up by Nureddin with sticks, stones and knives, and hanged from a tree. His head was smashed by cudgels and he was stoned to death. As described by Nureddin personally to Rıza Nur, who with İsmet Pasha was on his way to Lausanne to negotiate peace with the Allies, "his blood-covered body was subsequently hanged with an epitaph across his chest which read, 'Artin Kemal. To the murderers, this bestowal of a fictitious Armenian first name administered a final indignity to the victim. Upon İsmet Pasha's anger at this situation, his body was hurriedly removed, and was buried in İzmit. His tomb disappeared over time due to the lack of a tombstone or any sign on his grave, and after long researches, the burial location was determined in the 1950s.

Kemal Atatürk used to talk with disgust about the way he was killed.

Ali Kemal's death was also memorialised in a poem by Nâzım Hikmet: "I saw the blood run down into his moustache. Someone yelled: 'Get him!' It rained sticks, stones and rotten vegetables. They hung his body from a branch over that bridge."

Descendants and legacy 
During the First World War, the Ottoman Empire was one of the Central Powers allied with the German Empire, and Kemal's son and daughter living in England adopted their maternal grandmother's maiden name of Johnson. His son Osman also began to use his middle name of Wilfred as his first name. (Osman) Wilfred Johnson later married Irene Williams (the daughter of Stanley F. Williams of Bromley, Kent, by his marriage to Marie Luise, Freiin von Pfeffel, born in 1882) and their son Stanley Johnson became an expert on the environment and population studies and a Conservative member of the European Parliament. His son Boris Johnson, Kemal's great-grandson, became the Prime Minister of the United Kingdom on 24 July 2019.

After the First World War, Kemal's half-English daughter Celma returned to her Turkish surname of Kemal and also took Turkish nationality. She married Reginald St John Battersby and their son Anthony Battersby served in the Royal Marines, became an architect/ health planner, and spent most of his career working as a public health consultant for various UN agencies.

Sabiha, Kemal's second wife, went into exile in Switzerland with her son Zeki Kuneralp. He returned to Turkey after the death of Atatürk and was admitted—with the personal approval of President İsmet İnönü—into the Turkish Diplomatic Service, serving twice as its Permanent Under-secretary in the 1960s and serving as ambassador to London from 1964 to 1966 and again from 1966 to 1972. His wife and her brother were killed when an unidentified Armenian terrorist opened fire on his car while he was serving as ambassador in Madrid in 1978.

Zeki Kuneralp wrote an account of his father's life in English for the benefit of the British side of the family. Zeki's sons Sinan and Selim both live in Turkey. The former is a publisher in Istanbul and the latter followed his father into the diplomatic service.

References

Notes

Primary sources 
 M. Kayahan Özgül (ed.), Ali Kemâl, Ömrüm (Hece yayınları, Ankara, 2004)
 Zeki Kuneralp, ed., Ali Kemal, Ömrüm (İsis Publications, Istanbul, 1985)

Secondary sources 
 Osman Özsoy, Gazetecinin İnfazı ["The Execution of a Journalist", biography] (Timaş Yayınları, Istanbul, 1995)

External links 

 
 

1869 births
1922 deaths
Assassinated journalists from the Ottoman Empire
Deaths by beating
Government ministers of the Ottoman Empire
Exiles from the Ottoman Empire
People from the Ottoman Empire of Circassian descent
Political people from the Ottoman Empire
Turks from the Ottoman Empire
Journalists from Istanbul
People murdered in Turkey
Turkish people of Circassian descent
Turkish-language poets
Witnesses of the Armenian genocide
19th-century journalists from the Ottoman Empire
20th-century journalists from the Ottoman Empire
People from Çankırı
Politicians from Istanbul
Boris Johnson family